San Jose del Monte, officially the City of San Jose del Monte (abbreviated as SJDM or CSJDM), is a 1st class component city in the province of Bulacan, Philippines. According to the 2020 census, it has a population of 651,813 people, making it the largest local government unit within the province of Bulacan and Central Luzon and the 18th most populated city in the Philippines. The City of San Jose del Monte had been proclaimed as a highly urbanized city on December 4, 2020, by the virtue of Proclamation No. 1057, signed by President Rodrigo Duterte and shall take effect after the ratification in a plebiscite.

Located in the southeast of the province, it is bordered by the city of Caloocan in Metro Manila to the south, by the town of Rodriguez, Rizal to the east, the towns of Santa Maria and Marilao to the west and Norzagaray to the north.

The city is home to some of the biggest resettlement areas in the Philippines like the Sapang Palay resettlement area spread over 36 barangays, Pabahay 2000 in Barangay Muzon and Towerville in Barangay Minuyan Proper. Most of the city's population come from former informal settlers along the creeks, esteros, riverbanks and railway tracks of Metro Manila.

History
Early accounts on the founding of the city, as gathered from the old people, contend that it was formerly a part of the town of Meycauayan. This is supported by a decree from the Archbishop of Manila dated March 1750 on the creation of new municipalities. The municipality of San Jose del Monte was then officially founded on March 2, 1752.

The decree included the list of families who volunteered to be relocated. These families, most if not all from Lagulo (now Malhacan) in Meycauayan, brought with them rice, wine, nganga and salt from in exchange for the wild pigs, deer, yantok and almasigan of the Itas and Dumagats, the native inhabitants of the area. Solares, including intended lots for main roads, were peacefully distributed to the new occupants after being measured and surveyed.

The town reportedly got its name from Saint Joseph whose statue was found in a veritable forest; the hunters called it “San Jose del Monte” ( “Saint Joseph of the Mountain”). In all probability, the hunters reported their find to the parish priest of Meycauayan. It was said that the priest built a stone church at the site where the town proper is now located. The statue was installed in the new church. Extant Catholic Church records reveal that the first parish priest was Father Antonio de Moral. He took charge of the parish in 1845.

During the revolt against Spain, the town became a battleground between the Katipuneros and the Spanish forces. The revolutionaries lost and the vengeful Spanish soldiers burned down the settlement. The town people fled for their lives to nearby towns. At the advent of the American rule, it was made a part of Santa Maria until 1918 when the town was recreated and Ciriaco Gallardo appointed the first municipal president. Public schools were opened at the start of the American regime but due to the scarcity of the population, the highest grade organized was at the fourth grade.

During the Japanese occupation, the town became an ideal hiding place of the local recognized guerrillas because of the town's hilly and wooden terrain. The Japanese Imperial Army took over the local government of San Jose del Monte from 1942 to 1943. In resistance, the municipality formed its own guerrilla unit. San Jose del Monte experienced large casualties when the Americans bombed the town center on January 11, 1945, and again on January 14, 1945. When the combined Filipino and American troops came, peace reigned but not for long.

At the height of the Hukbalahap Rebellion, the town was raided on October 10, 1950. The Huks burned down the town hall. The town was raided for the second time on March 21, 1951. The Huks did not succeed because of the precautionary measures instituted by the town officials after which the Huks were gradually eliminated.

In the 1980s, thousands of informal settlers from Metro Manila were relocated to San Jose del Monte. Bulacan Governor Roberto Pagdanganan recalled in 1996 that the relocation did not ensure new livelihoods for its informal settlers, thus turning many squatters toward criminality; he noted that the town had the highest crime rate in the province according to police reports. In 1988, Eduardo Roquero was elected mayor of the municipality by a margin of 8 votes against his closest opponent, reelectionist Reynaldo Villano.

Cityhood

On September 10, 2000, San Jose del Monte was proclaimed as a Component City under Republic Act No. 8797. It became the first city in the province of Bulacán and was recorded as the 86th chartered city of the Philippines. On December 18, 2003, the City of San Jose del Monte became the 1st Lone Congressional District in Bulacán.

Highly urbanized city
On December 4, 2020, President Rodrigo Duterte declared San Jose del Monte as a highly urbanized city through Proclamation No. 1057. However, it will have to go through a plebiscite to ratify its city charter, and it will be held four months after the 2022 national and local elections.

Division of Barangay Muzon
On July 1, 2022, a bill seeking for the division of Barangay Muzon lapsed into law as Republic Act No. 11896. Under that law, the village will be divided into four, namely, Muzon Proper, Muzon East, Muzon West and Muzon South. The plebiscite, to be supervised by the Commission on Elections, will be held on March 25, 2023.

Geography
This is because the city is part of the Sierra Madre mountain range. Plains and river valley flats characterize the western and southwestern quadrant. The central portion and much of its eastern section are made up of undulating hills with low relief. High relief areas moderate slopes best describe its extreme eastern and northwestern quadrant. Slopes of 3%-8% are extensively found in the city, particularly on the western half. Slopes of 30%-50% comprise the smallest portion of the total land area.

The rivers and creeks that flow in San Jose del Monte are direct tributaries of the Angat River, which flows from the Angat Reservoir. Major natural waterways of San Jose del Monte are the Kipungok, Santo Cristo, and Santa Maria River systems. Kipungok River separates San Jose del Monte from Caloocan and Rodriguez. It is directly connected to the Marilao River, which flows downwards to Manila Bay. Draining to these rivers are creeks and streams, which act as catchment areas for the surface water runoff of the city. Among these are the Bigte, Kantulot, Katinga, and Salamin creeks.

General land use

Growing commercial, residential, and light industrial areas, are found all over the city at major road intersections and along major thoroughfares. However, the bulk of the San Jose del Monte's built-up areas are mostly west of Quirino Highway at the primary level to gently sloping 8% terrain, dividing the city into a heavily built-up western section and the largely agricultural eastern section. Most of the city's schools, government institutions, commercial developments, industries, and other urban amenities are in this section. The largest contiguous built-up area is at Sapang Palay Resettlement Project area, followed by the conurbation in Tungkong Mangga and Muzon.

The developments east of the Quirino Highway are mostly scattered residential areas and agricultural lands. However, there are a few subdivisions that are some distance away from Ciudad Real and take advantage of its secluded and rural atmosphere. These are the Blessed Sacrament Seminary and an Augustinian convent.

In between the built-up clusters are pockets of agricultural lands, which are continuously converted into built-up uses. Planted in these lands are crops such as rice and corn. The clustering pattern for both built-up and agricultural uses is partly due to the decisions made by settlers with regard to the hilly conditions that dominate the topography. Most of households in the western half of San Jose del Monte opted to convert their lands to residential uses while other maintained the farms. This left upland uses, such as those pertaining to forest use, more common towards the easternmost zones.

Most vegetative outgrowths are in areas that are difficult to build on. But there are instances when these outgrowths are integrated in the built-up areas, usually found in the west: a number of heavily vegetated areas. Supplementing these are mini forest projects of the city government. The City Agriculture Office maintains a 1.65-hectare Mini Forest Project in Barangay Muzon along the San Jose del Monte-Marilao Provincial Road and a mahogany planting site.

Climate

Barangays
San Jose del Monte is politically subdivided into 59 barangays, which handle governance in a much smaller area. These barangays are grouped into two districts, 23 barangays comprise the first district while 36 compose the second commonly known as Sapang Palay, and the city has Lone District, which is represented by a congressman in the country's House of Representatives.

Of the 3,102 barangays in Region III, the largest in terms of population size is Muzon in the City of San Jose del Monte, Bulacan with 106,603 people.

Demographics

This makes it the largest local government unit in Bulacan province. It is also the largest city in Central Luzon (Region III).

With the coming of settlers to San Jose Del Monte, its population increased tremendously. Its population increased dramatically since the 1950s as the population tended to move from rural areas to towns and cities. Its proximity to Manila allowed it to accommodate its spillover population. This is further hastened by the development of nearby Quezon City and the accompanying increase in population and infrastructure.

Forced relocation of informal settlers and the lure of government to provide them their own homes allowed the town to continue to grow despite the lack of government facilities then. As such, San Jose del Monte exhibited an increasing percentage share to the provincial population from as low as 2% in 1960 to 9% in 1990 and then to 17% in 2015. The town surpassed the population of Meycauayan in 1980 census and Malolos in the 1990 census, then the largest towns of Bulacan. By 2015, it has more than two times the population of the now second place Santa Maria town (256,454 people in the 2015 Census).

If current population growth holds (2010-2015, +4.55%), the population of San Jose del Monte is expected to double and breach one million by the 2030 Census.

Economy

Agriculture
Major agricultural crops are leafy vegetables, root crops (cassava as its OTOP), pineapple, mango and coffee beans.

Livestock and poultry
The major income earner is large- and small-scale swine production. There are 60 commercial livestock and poultry farms in the city. The major poultry producers are RFM Corporation, Vitarich and FELDAN.

Trade and commerce
The city has three major business district growth areas: Tungkong Mangga, Muzon and Sapang Palay (Sampol). They are in wholesale and retail trade.

The minor business districts include Towerville in Minuyan Proper, Palmera in Kaypian, Northgate in Santo Cristo, Citrus, Poblacion I, Grotto in Graceville, Francisco Homes, Gumaoc and San Rafael III.

Commercial and thrift banks, pawnshops and cooperatives provide financial services. There are two major malls: Starmall San Jose del Monte in Palmera and SM City San Jose del Monte in Tungkong Mangga.

Tourism

 Mount Balagbag and Kaytitinga Falls in Barangay, San Isidro are the main tourist attractions in the city. A portion of the Angat Watershed Forest Reserve also extends to San Jose del Monte.
 VS Orchids Farm (Santo Cristo) is the biggest orchids nursery and ornamental plants farm in Bulacan (owned by Rolita Spowart, 3 Manila Seedling Bank Foundation, Quezon City). Hundreds of orchids species are nurtured in this 1.8 hectares flora haven.
 The Our Lady of Lourdes Grotto Shrine, is a Roman Catholic pilgrimage site often visited by devotees during Holy Week.

Infrastructure

Transportation
The city is serviced by bus routes going to and from Parañaque (Baclaran), Muntinlupa (Alabang), Taguig (FTI), Makati, Quiapo and Santa Cruz districts in Manila, Novaliches district in Quezon City and Ninoy Aquino International Airport. Jeepney routes also ply the roads between the city and neighboring cities and towns in Metro Manila and Bulacan province. 

Below are the routes that the jeeps and e-jeeps ply by:

 Norzagaray to SM Fairview
 Bigte to Novaliches
 Sapang Palay to Grotto (via Tungkong Mangga)
 Sapang Palay to Novaliches
 Sapang Palay to Muzon (via Tunkong Mangga)
 Area H to Sampol (via Loop)
 Sampol to Santa Maria (via Bulac)
 Sampol to Santa Maria (via San Jose Bayan)
 San Jose del Monte to SM Marilao
 San Jose del Monte to Malolos (via NLEX)
 Muzon to Novaliches
 Muzon Central Terminal to Cubao (via Kalayaan Avenue)
 Francisco Homes to Cubao (via Kalayaan Avenue)
 Sapang Palay to Minuyan Loop
 Grotto Shop and Ride to Minuyan Loop (via Verde Heights)
 Starmall SJDM to Minuyan Loop (via Kaypian)
 Tungkong Mangga to Licao-Licao

Below are the routes that the bus ply by:

 Angat to Quezon Avenue*
 Sapang Palay to PITX
 Sapang Palay to Santa Cruz (via Marilao)
 Sapang Palay to Divisoria (Santa Cruz) (via Bocaue)

*Take note that the buses do not travel all the way up to Angat; their last destination would be in Road 2 or in Sampol.
The following are the main arteries of San Jose del Monte's road network which link the 59 barangays with Metro Manila and the rest of Bulacan.
 Quirino Highway is a national road which stretches from the town of Norzagaray to Quezon City.
 Bocaue - San Jose Road, also called Gov. Fortunato Halili Avenue, is a provincial road which links the city passing through Tungkong Mangga (Tungko) via Muzon to the town of Santa Maria, Bocaue and to the North Luzon Expressway.
 Sapang Palay Road - Santa Maria Road links the Sapang Palay Resettlement Project to town of Santa Maria passing through Barangay Bulac, Barangay Catmon & Barangay San Jose Patag in the said town.
 San Jose - Marilao Road links the city with the municipality of Marilao and to the North Luzon Expressway. This is now a permanent full exit.
 Sapang Palay Road, also called Eduardo V. Roquero Avenue, links the Sapang Palay Resettlement Project to Quirino Highway and in the opposite end to Sapang Palay Proper.
 Igay Road links the upper barangay to Quirino Highway and Rodriguez, Rizal.

Water
The bulk of the city's water requirement is being served by the San Jose Del Monte City Water District together via Joint Venture Agreement to Prime Water Corporation.

Power
Power distribution is being undertaken by the Manila Electric Company (Meralco). The city hosts the biggest National Grid Corporation of the Philippines (NGCP) sub-station in the country in Barangay Dulong Bayan.

Telecommunications/communications
Landline telephone systems are provided by the PLDT and Globe.

Internet service is available through PLDT Home Fiber and DSL and Globe Fiber and Converge Fiber X.

Mobile telephone services are provided by Smart Communications, Globe Telecom and Dito Telecommunity.

Education

Public high schools 
 City of San Jose del Monte National High School
 Muzon National High School
 Graceville National High School
 Muzon Harmony Hills High School
 Minuyan National High School
 Marangal National High School
 Kaypian National High School
 Paradise Farms National High School
 Kakawate National High School
 Citrus National High School
 San Jose del Monte National High School
 San Martin National High School
 Sapang Palay National High School
 Santo Cristo National High School
 San Jose del Monte National Trade School
 Towerville National High School
 City of San Jose del Monte National Science High School
 San Rafael National High School
 San Jose Del Monte Heights High School

Government

Like other cities in the Philippines, San Jose del Monte is governed by a mayor and vice mayor elected to three-year terms. The mayor is the executive head and leads the city's departments in executing the city ordinances and improving public services. The vice mayor heads a legislative council consisting of 12 members 6 from District I and 6 from District II. The council is in charge of creating the city's policies.

San Jose del Monte, being a part of the Bulacan province, has its mayor in the city council heading the Area Integrated Development Authority (AIDA), a special committee created during the term of then Mayor Eduardo V. Roquero to concentrate on the improvement of 3 highly commercialized areas such as, Tungkong Mangga, Muzon, and Sampol areas.. This council formulates development plans that seeks to solve the problems and improve the conditions in the metropolis.

Current city officials (2022-2025)

List of former municipal and city mayors

References

External links
 
 
 
 [ Philippine Standard Geographic Code]
 San Jose del Monte City Bulacan
 Philippine Census Information

 
Cities in Bulacan
Populated places established in 1752
1752 establishments in the Philippines
Component cities in the Philippines